The First Lady of Sierra Leone is the spouse of the President of Sierra Leone. Though it is not an elected position, the First Lady is a representative of Sierra Leone at home and abroad. The Office of the First Lady is an extension of State House and is responsible for social events and ceremonies at State Lodge.

Five women have held the office of First Lady since Sierra Leone the office was formed in 1971. The first was Rebecca Stevens, wife of former president Siaka Stevens, who lived at the official presidential residence at King Harmon Road while her husband lived at Kabasa Lodge.

The current First Lady of Sierra Leone is Fatima Maada Bio, wife of President Julius Maada Bio who took office on April 4, 2018.

First Ladies of Sierra Leone (1971–present)

References

External links
 State House Sierra Leone
 First Lady Sierra Leone

First Ladies of Sierra Leone
Sierra Leone
Lists of Sierra Leonean people